Pierre Jannet (5 January 1820, Saint-Germain-de-Grave – November 1870, Paris) was a 19th-century French bibliophile and bibliographer.

A self-educated publisher, Jannet published with the assistance of Ternaux-Compans, the Bibliothèque elzévirienne, elegant collection of 16th-century French writers, of which he edited himself several volumes: l’Ancien Théâtre Français, les Facétieuses de Straparole, etc.

He wrote several collections of bibliographies.

Sources 
 Gustave Vapereau, Dictionnaire universel des littératures, Paris, Hachette, 1876, p. 1090
 Alphonse Alkan, Les étiquettes et les inscriptions des boîtes-volumes de Pierre Jannet, Fondateur de la Bibliothèque elzéverienne, 1883

External links 
 Pierre Jannet on data.bnf.fr

French bibliographers
French bibliophiles
People from Gironde
1820 births
1870 deaths